Boomerang (Frederick "Fred" Myers) is a fictional character appearing in American comic books published by Marvel Comics. He has been a member of several prominent supervillain teams and clashed with several heroes throughout his career, most notably Spider-Man.

Publication history

Boomerang first appeared in Tales to Astonish #81 (July 1966), and was created by Stan Lee and Jack Kirby.

He appeared as a regular character in Thunderbolts beginning in issue #157, and remained with the team after the title transitioned into Dark Avengers beginning with issue #175 through the conclusion of the series.

Boomerang features as the narrator and one of the main characters in Superior Foes of Spider-Man.

Fictional character biography
Fred Myers was born in Alice Springs, Northern Territory, Australia, and was raised in the United States. As a young boy he developed a love for baseball, and spent years training and perfecting his pitching arm. By the time he was a young adult, Fred had realized his dream of pitching for a major league team. However, he foolishly began accepting bribes and was drummed out of the major leagues after being discovered. Shortly thereafter, Myers was contacted by the Secret Empire, an international criminal organization that saw the potential of his skills. Myers agreed and was given a new costume and an arsenal of deadly boomerangs, from which he derived his new code name. He battled the Hulk after taking Betty Ross hostage to get plans, but the Hulk rescued Betty. Boomerang fell off a cliff, seemingly to his death.

After the Secret Empire collapsed, Boomerang returned to his native Australia and laid low for a few years, perfecting his deadly aim and making modifications to his weapons. Once he was ready, he returned to America and began offering his services as a freelance assassin-for-hire. His first mission was to assassinate Iron Fist, though he was defeated. He was next hired as part of a large group of superhuman criminals employed by Libra to battle the Defenders. He was hired by Viper to participate in a plot against S.H.I.E.L.D., and battled Spider-Man, Nick Fury, Shang-Chi, and the Black Widow. Boomerang next sought to kill Spider-Man in order to impress the Kingpin of Crime and thus gain employment, but he was defeated by the wall-crawler and apprehended by the police. He was seen next helping the Punisher escape from prison. Boomerang was eventually released from prison. He was hired by Max Stryker to coerce Bruce Banner into using an experimental cancer cure that uses gamma rays on Stryker, but wound up battling the Hulk, Banner's alter ego, instead.

Boomerang was then recruited by Jack O'Lantern into the Sinister Syndicate. As part of that team, he battled Spider-Man, Silver Sable, and the Sandman. Then, he was hired by Louis Baxter III to attack a yacht, and again battled Spider-Man. He then battled Hawkeye at the instigation of a disguised Loki. Next, he teamed with Blacklash and Blizzard II to help Iron Man battle the Ghost. He was then employed by Justin Hammer, and battled Cardiac and Spider-Man. With the Sinister Syndicate again, he participated in a crime spree. During these events, Boomerang vied with Speed Demon for Leila Davis's affections. Boomerang was among several of the hired killers who responded to an open bounty on Matt Murdock that was put out by Samuel Silke as part of an elaborate plan to usurp the Kingpin's empire. After defeating Shotgun, Daredevil detects Myers on an adjacent rooftop. Boomerang in hand, Myers hesitates when he realizes Daredevil has discovered him, and then runs away. Daredevil follows him, beats him, and threatens him when he finds the picture of Matt Murdock in Myers' pocket. Myers subsequently tried to sue Murdock for $1,000,000 over the beating.

Around this time he also worked for the villain the Owl. He teamed up with the super-powered villain Grizzly. Both created new stylish outfits for themselves, Boomerang's resembling a three-piece business suit. This did not last long, however, and he soon returned to his old costume.

Boomerang has been a member of Crimson Cowl's Masters of Evil and battled the Thunderbolts. He has also been a member of the Sinister Twelve.

Boomerang plays a small role in the "Secret War" crossover event.

During the "Civil War" storyline, Boomerang is briefly shown as a captive of Baron Zemo, captured before Zemo's team was given official sanction to take down villains.

Despite this, he appears with Hydro-Man and Shocker, on the rooftop of Bailey's auction house. Their robbery attempt is cut short by War Machine and Komodo's attempt to capture Spider-Man; the three villains escape but are pursued by the Scarlet Spiders. He gathered a group of villains together and tried to extort money from the new Thunderbolts director Norman Osborn, but was viciously beaten by Osborn and is now forced to secretly work for him. Boomerang was seen at the Bar With No Name when Spider-Man and Daredevil crash the place.

During the "Dark Reign" storyline, Boomerang is added to Fifty State Initiative team the Heavy Hitters, using the name "Outback". When Nonstop tries to quit and escapes, the other team members chase her and capture her. When a news crew arrives, Outback attempts to frame Nonstop as a thief, but Prodigy reveals "Outback" as Boomerang and punches him out.

During the "Siege" storyline, "Outback" is part of the forces at Camp HAMMER that battle the Avengers Resistance when the group attacks. He is knocked out by Ultra Girl and Batwing.

Boomerang appeared as a hired goon of the Rose and came into conflict with Jackpot, where he discovered her secret identity. He tracks Sara down at her house and murders her husband in front of her and her daughter.

Boomerang appears later as a member of Bella Donna Boudreaux's Assassins' Guild and confronts Wolverine, Domino and X-Force.

After being imprisoned at the Raft, Boomerang was selected to be a part of the "beta team" of the Thunderbolts, alongside Shocker, Troll, Mister Hyde, and Centurius.

As part of the "Marvel NOW!", Boomerang appears in the latest incarnation of the Sinister Six. The Sinister Six was defeated by the Superior Spider-Man (Doctor Octopus' mind in Spider-Man's body) and Boomerang was nearly beaten to death until Peter Parker's consciousness restrains Superior Spider-Man. Boomerang was seen in the Raft's infirmary with Scorpion and Vulture where they are enhanced by Alistair Smythe's mini Spider-Slayers after accepting the offer to kill Superior Spider-Man. While Scorpion goes after Mayor J. Jonah Jameson and Vulture targets the other civilians, Boomerang engages Superior Spider-Man who wounds Boomerang by webbing up his Bomb-o-Rangs.

In the series Superior Foes of Spider-Man, Boomerang assumes leadership of the Sinister Six. In the final issue, it is revealed that a drunk Boomerang was recounting the events of the series to an unseen barfly. After admitting that he may have exaggerated or outright fabricated many of the details, Boomerang asks his companion what his name is. The man responds with "Peter".

During the "Secret Empire"' storyline, Boomerang is operating as a crime boss of Newark. After Captain America was turned into a HYDRA agent by Red Skull's clone using the powers of Kobik and take over the world after killing Red Skull's clone, Boomerang offers a shelter for Maria Hill, Black Widow, and her Champions to devise a plan to rebel against HYDRA's regime. Later on, his safehouse is attacked by Punisher who is now apparently in the employ of HYDRA.

Boomerang later becomes the roommate of Peter Parker.

During the "Hunted" storyline, Boomerang was seen as a patron at the Pop-Up with No Name.

During Sinister War, Boomerang was forced by Kindred into joining a faction of Spider-Man’s foes consisting Shocker, Overdrive and Speed Demon to hunt Spider-Man before some rest of the team of Spider-Man’s foes got him. In truth, Boomerang secretly helps Spider-Man to ensure his safety and find Kindred to stop his madness. When saving Spider-Man from Morlun, Boomerang was killed by the Inheritor, who unexpectedly found his soul to be satisfying. Morlun is then attacked and pummeled by an enraged Spider-Man. Boomerang’s death cause the rest of Spider-Man’s villain teams to be distracted into fighting each other over their hunt for Spider-Man, allowing Doc Ock to buy a time to free the villains from Kindred’s control with his device without killing them, and Spider-Man can now proceed finding Kindred.

Powers, abilities, and equipment
Fred Myers has no superhuman powers, but he has the strength, speed, agility, dexterity, reflexes, coordination, and endurance of a professional athlete from his days as a baseball player. He can throw small objects with nearly unerring accuracy, and his aim is nearly the peak of what a non-superpowered human can accomplish. Only characters like Bullseye, Hawkeye, and Taskmaster can match his accuracy.

Boomerang's most dangerous asset is, naturally, his arsenal of specialized boomerangs designed by Justin Hammer. He has modified and improved on them over the years, but the most common ones are exploding "shatterangs" (with enough explosive power to destroy an automobile), "gasarangs" that release large doses of tear gas to disable a target, razor-bladed "razorangs", sonic blasting "screamerangs", and whirling "bladarangs" which cut like buzzsaw blades.

Boomerang wears light body armor supplied by Hammer, with a wide variety of hidden pockets and pouches for his smaller, specialized boomerangs, in addition to attachments for securing the seven larger primary boomerangs.

Boomerang has knowledge of basic street-fighting techniques.

Reception
 In 2020, CBR.com ranked Boomerang 9th in their "10 Most Powerful Members of the Sinister Syndicate" list.

Other versions

Ultimate Marvel
The Ultimate version of Boomerang appeared briefly in Ultimate Spider-Man. Spider-Man saved him from being shot by the Punisher during a heist. Boomerang thanks and then offers Spider-Man thousands of dollars to save him from the police, but Spider-Man webs him up along with his would-be assassin/thief. Like the Shocker, his Ultimate self is a much weaker, almost parody version of himself.

JLA/Avengers

Boomerang is among the enthralled villains defending Krona's stronghold, and is defeated by Barry Allen's Flash.

Amazing Spider-Man: Renew Your Vows
During the "Secret Wars" storyline in the pages of Amazing Spider-Man: Renew Your Vows, Boomerang works as an enforcer of Regent where he, Rhino, and Shocker beat up Demolition Man for protesting against Regent's rules. Regent later recruits Boomerang, Beetle, and Rhino to fill in the membership gaps in the Sinister Six following the deaths of Doctor Octopus and Hobgoblin and Vulture being incapacitated. He and the Sinister Six attack S.H.I.E.L.D.'s secret base after Regent probed Sandman's mind.

In other media

Television
 Boomerang appears in the "Incredible Hulk" segment of The Marvel Super Heroes, voiced by Ed McNamara.
 Boomerang appears in The Avengers: United They Stand episode "Command Decision" voiced by Rob Cowan. This version is a member of Baron Helmut Zemo's Masters of Evil.
 Boomerang appears in Ultimate Spider-Man, voiced by Rob Paulsen.

Video games
 Boomerang appears as the first boss of The Uncanny X-Men. This version is a mutant with near-perfect throwing accuracy.
 Boomerang appears as a boss in Spider-Man and Captain America in Doctor Doom's Revenge.
 The Ultimate Marvel incarnation of Boomerang appears as a minor boss in the Ultimate Spider-Man video game.
 An exclusive Marvel Noir incarnation of Boomerang appears as a boss in the Nintendo DS version of Spider-Man: Shattered Dimensions, voiced by Jim Cummings. He attempts to steal a piece of the Tablet of Order and Chaos from a museum, but is defeated by Spider-Man Noir.
 Boomerang appears as a boss and an unlockable playable character in Marvel: Avengers Alliance.
 Boomerang appears in Marvel: Avengers Alliance 2.

References

External links
 Boomerang at Marvel.com
 Profile at Spiderfan.org
 

Characters created by Jack Kirby
Characters created by Stan Lee
Comics characters introduced in 1966
Fictional assassins in comics
Fictional baseball players
Fictional blade and dart throwers
Fictional people from the Northern Territory
Marvel Comics male supervillains
Marvel Comics supervillains
Spider-Man characters